Elections in Ireland may refer to:
 Elections in the Republic of Ireland
 Elections in Northern Ireland
 Elections in the United Kingdom (from 1801 to 1918)
 Elections to the Irish House of Commons (abolished in 1800)